Botswana's most popular landmarks range from a group of large baobab trees to giant-size footprints fossilized in the rock. Other natural attractions include expanses of salt flats, the Kalahari desert and some very beautiful mountains.

|}

References

Sources
 

Monuments and memorials in Botswana